Mordechai Werdyger (born April 16, 1951) is an American Israeli Chasidic Jewish singer and songwriter who is popular in the Orthodox Jewish community. He is the son of cantor David Werdyger and uses the stage name Mordechai Ben David or its initials, MBD.  He is known as the "King of Jewish Music" and has released over 40 albums while performing internationally. He headlined the HASC and Ohel charity concerts for years. On February 27, 2022, he was inducted with the inaugural class of the Jewish Music Hall of Fame.

Genre
He started his musical career in the early 1970s, a time when Hazzanut was the main source of recorded music in Jewish Orthodox circles, with very few solo singer performers. Two singers who preceded Werdyger were Bentzion Shenker and Shlomo Carlebach, who had started a genre rooted in Hasidic and American folk song in the early 1960s.

Mordechai Ben David based his career on his father David's, choosing Mordechai Ben David (Mordechai Son of David) as his stage name. In contrast to his father, who recorded classic Hasidic niggunim (songs) with cantorial vocals and classical instruments, Ben David blended traditional Hasidic singing with modern and popular music techniques. He was encouraged in this by Rabbi Chaim Zanvl Abramowitz, the Ribnitzer rebbe.

In Ben David's music most of the lyrics are based on Hebrew prayer, biblical passages, and
Jewish religious poetry, known as Zemirot. Other songs, composed in English, Yiddish, and Modern Hebrew, carry religious themes such as the sanctity of Shabbos and the yearning for Moshiach. His recordings include traditional Chasidic melodies of Eastern European folk-style alongside more modern jazz, pop, and rock music.
 
Werdyger worked with composers and arrangers including Yisroel Lamm (the Neginah Orchestra) and Moshe (Mona) Rosenblum, as well as Suki Berry, Moshe Laufer and Yossi Green, Boruch Chait and Abie Rotenberg, Hershel Lebovits and Nachman Klein. He has also collaborated with musicians including Yaron Gershovsky (director of the Manhattan Transfer), Daniel Freiberg and Ken Burgess.

Ben David was a soloist on a number of his late father David Werdyger's albums. He has also appeared on albums produced and sung by his son Yeedle Werdyger, and brother Mendy Werdyger. He has appeared on a number of "All Star Cast" albums produced by Suki & Ding, Gideon Levine, and Avi Fischoff.

Together with producer Sheya Mendlowitz, he produced Avraham Fried's first solo album, entitled "No Jew Will Be Left Behind" in 1981. That same year, Sheya was involved with two of Mordechai's releases: "Mordechai Ben David Live" (his first live album) and "Memories", which was written in memory of his mother, A"H. This album also featured a number of songs composed by Yerachmiel Begun of the Toronto and Miami Boys Choirs. Over the following next few years, Sheya and Mordechai jointly produced a number of hit albums together, including: his "MBD & Friends" (1987), "Mostly Horas" (1987), "Yisroel Lamm & The Philharmonic Experience" (1988), and "25 Years of Jewish Music" (1988). Sheya Mendlowitz went on to produce Mordechai's "Simen Tov - Keitzad" (single album) (1989), and "The Double Album" (1990).

Music and politics
Some of Werdyger's songs have carried political messages.

In 1984 and 1985, MBD's songs "Hold On" and "Let My People Go" focused on the Jewish refusenik plight behind the Soviet Iron Curtain. While "Hold On" expresses hope, "Let My People Go" specifically calls for "support and pressure" to free Anatoly Natan Sharansky and Ida Nudel from Soviet captivity.

In 1986 MBD's quasi-rock beat "Jerusalem Is Not For Sale" spearheaded the Haredi opposition to Mormon missionary practice in Jerusalem. The lyrics read "You better run for your life, back to Utah overnight, before the mountain top opens wide to swallow you inside." as well as "The wars, the pain, brought masses returning, back to their roots more than ever. The leftists fiercely fighting truth, dampening the sparks still burning. So wake up my friend, this is the very end, the arrows are pointing our way!"

1994's "Yerushalayim We Will Never Leave You", recorded in Hebrew and English, protested the intent of dividing Jerusalem under the Oslo I Accord.

MBD released a single track in 1996, named "Chevron Always And Forever" (heb. חברון מאז ולתמיד), protesting proposed Israeli concessions over Hebron under the Oslo II Interim Agreement.

In 1999, on a track sung in Hebrew, "Ad Matay" (heb.עד מתי), written by Chaim Walder, Werdyger took on tensions between Israeli secular and religious parties. This dramatic composition expressed a heart-wrenching cry against internal hatred and takes an indirect shot at anti-religious politicians Yossi Sarid (Meretz) and Tommy Lapid (Shinui) by rhyming their surnames into a phrase depicting "the flame of hatred [lapid lit flame] which leaves no remnants [sarid lit remnant]".

In 2010, MBD re-wrote his famous English song "Unity", expressing protest of alleged Federal injustice to Sholom Rubashkin in his widely publicized case in the U.S. The song, renamed "Unity For Justice", was performed by MBD together with Avraham Fried and forty famous Jewish singers. An HD Video recording was publicized on a petition website as well as the social network.

Obama controversy
In 2016, Mordechai Ben David attracted controversy after a video taken at his December 28 concert in Jerusalem, wherein he referred to US President Barack Obama with the derogatory Hebrew racial term kushi, was circulated online. During the concert, Ben David was between songs while performing a song about peace before thousands of people in Jerusalem  when he remarked to the audience in Hebrew, "Do you know when there will be peace? In a few weeks, when there will be a new president in the United States and the kushi goes home." The statement prompted cheers from the audience, which included Jerusalem Mayor Nir Barkat and Interior Minister Aryeh Deri, both of whom had previously criticized Obama and expressed approval of President-elect Donald Trump.

The statement prompted criticism from several outlets, many of whom characterized the term "kushi" as a racial slur and accused Ben David and his audience of racism. Rabbi Yair Hoffman, in an opinion piece for Yeshiva World News, criticized media coverage of the incident, noting that the audience had cheered after "there will be a new president" rather than at the racial term and arguing that, while Ben-David's use of the term was "wrong" and merited an apology, the term itself was not necessarily pejorative or derogatory. Despite a descriptive etymology referring to Ethiopians, in modern Hebrew "kushi" is widely considered a derogatory term. Barkat and Deri, who spoke after Ben David's use of the epithet, did not bring attention to the usage although they both echoed Ben David's sentiments regarding Obama and Trump.

Family
His father, David Werdyger, was a hazzan (cantor) and Holocaust survivor originally from Kraków. His brother, Mendy, is also a Jewish singer and owner of the Jewish record label Aderet Records and its retail store in Boro Park, Brooklyn. His son, Yeedle,  and nephew, Yisroel Werdyger (Mendy's son), are also Jewish singers.

His wife, Esther, is the daughter and sister of hazzanim. His brother-in-law Ari Klein is a cantor who has recorded several albums. His cousin, Shmilu Rosenberg of Canada released two albums in the 1980s.

In April 2017, Werdyger wrote and released a song titled "Boee Besholom" dedicated to the marriage of his granddaughter. The song was sung at the wedding by Werdyger and Lipa Schmeltzer who was one of the guests.

He records in his private studio in Sea Gate, Brooklyn.

His single "Yachad Shivtei Yisrael" was composed in honor of the 2012 Siyum HaShas.

A single composed for the Days of Awe, "Nekom", was released in 2015.

In June 2017 he released the album Tzeaka  including soloists Motty Steimetz and Nussi Fuchs.

Werdyger does not sing at mixed concerts.

Song adaptations 
A few of his songs are adaptations of well-known, non-Jewish songs.

"Hinei Lo Yanum" on Hineni (1974) is an adaptation of "Mamy Blue", originally composed by veteran French songwriter Hubert Giraud in 1970. In May 1971, Alain Milhaud, a French record producer based in Spain, acquired the song for Pop-Tops.
"Shir Hashalom" on his Neshoma-Soul album (1975) is an adaptation from Bobby Vinton's "My Melody of Love".
"Lichtiger Shabbos" on Just One Shabbos (1982) [retitled "Yiddish" on Solid MBD (1993)] is an adaptation of "Close Every Door To Me", from the musical theater production Joseph and the Amazing Technicolor Dreamcoat, by Tim Rice and Andrew Lloyd Webber.
"Kumt Aheim" on Jerusalem: Not For Sale (1986), commonly referred to as "Yidden" and retitled as such for the CD release, uses the music of "Dschinghis Khan" (English: Genghis Khan), from the German band Dschinghis Khan.
"Father Dear" on Yerushalayim Our Home (1988) [retitled "Daddy Dear" on The English Collection (1998)] uses music from the song "Little Boy and the Old Man", written by singer-songwriter Wayne Shanklin.

In addition, "V'chol Ma'aminim", from his album of the same name, was an adaptation of "Tov Lehodos", an earlier song by Shlomo Carlebach.

Discography

Solo albums 
Mordechai Ben David Werdyger Sings Original Chassidic Nigunim (1973)
Hineni (1974)
Neshama Soul (1975)
I'd Rather Pray and Sing (1977)
V'chol Ma'aminim - Songs of Yomim Noraim (1978)
Moshiach Is Coming Soon (1980)
Mordechai Ben David Live (1981)
Memories (1981)
Ich Hob Gevart (I Have Waited) (1982)
Just One Shabbos (1982)
Around the Year Vol. 1 (1983)
Hold On (1984)
Let My People Go (1985)
Jerusalem Not For Sale (1986)
MBD and Friends (1987)
Jerusalem Our Home - Lekovod Yom Tov (1988)
Siman Tov / Kaitzad (single) (1989)
The Double Album (1990)
Solid MBD (1990)
Live in Yerushalayim (1991)
Moshiach, Moshiach, Moshiach (1992)
Tomid B'Simcha - Always Happy (1994)
Once Upon a Niggun (1996)
Chevron - Always & Forever (single) (1996)
Ein Od Milvado (1997)
The English Collection (1998)
We Are One (1999)
Maaminim (2001)
Kumzits (2003)
Nachamu Ami (2004)
Oorah (single) (2005)
Efshar Letaken (2006)
Yiddish Collection (2007)
Anovim Anovim (single) (2008)
Oorah (single) (2008)
Levado - Mishpacha (single) (2008)
Kulam Ahuvim (2009)
Platinum Collection (2009)
Kisufim (2011)
Omdos Hoyu (single) (2012)
Yachad Shivtei Yisrael (single) (2012)
Afofuni (single) (2013)
Nekom (single) (2015)
Tzeaka (2017)
Kdei Rabi Shimon (single) (2019)
Day (single) (2020)
Le'shana Haba'a Benei Chorin (single) (2021)
Forever/Lanetzach (single) (2022)
Hashpuois (2022)

On His Father David Werdyger's Albums 
 L'dovid Mizmor "Songs of David" (1960) (Credited as Marc)	
Gerer Melava Malka Melodies (1963)	
Skulaner Nigunim - Oidchu Hashem (1968)	
 Melodies of Camp Kol-Ree-Nah (1969)
Chassidic Nigunim (1971)
Skulaner Nigunim 2 (1977)
Melitzer Oneg Shabbos 2 (1979)
Boyaner Nigunim - Yismechu Bemalchuscha (1980)
Sadegurer Nigunim (1981) (Mordechai Ben David Orchestra)
Satmerer Nigunim (1981)
Father & Sons Biglal Avos (1984)
Esso Einai El Hehorim (1985)
A Shabbos with David Werdyger (1990)

Collaborations 
Jewish Education Program, Vol. 4 Someday We Will All Be Together (1979)
 Jerusalem (1983)
Simcha (1984)
Torah (1985)
Hallel (1987)
25 Years of Jewish Music (1988)
 The Bentching Tape (1993)
Yeedle, Together (1993)
3 Generations - Yom Shekulo Shabbos (1993)
Special Moments With Mordechai Ben David, Mendy, & Yeedle Werdyger - The Wedding Album (1995)
Yeedle, Laasos Retzon Avicha (1995)
Best of the Best 1 (1996)
Solid Gold Volume 1 (1997)
Solid Gold Volume 2 (1998)
Lev Vanefesh II (1998)
Mona 3 (1998)
Solid Gold Volume 3 (1999)
Hameshorerim (1999)
Ken Burgess, I'll Never Walk Alone in the Desert (2000)
All Star Collection (2000)
The Vocal Version (2001)
Best of the Best 2 (2002)
Yeedle, IV (2002)
Mona, Mona 4 (2003)
Sheves Achim, Shabbos In Mezibuz (2004)
Ken Burgess, Melech (2005)
Brand New (2005)
Shabbos With the Werdygers 1 (2006)
Yeedle, Lev Echad (2008)
Hameorerim (2008)
The 8th Note (2008)
Shabbos With the Werdygers 2 (2010)
Lipa Schmeltzer, Meimka Dlipa: From the Depth of My Heart (2010)
Miami Boys Choir, Light Up the Nights & Greatest Dance Hits (2010)
Big Time - Alter Heim - Then & Now (2011)
Yeedle, A Verdige Yid (2013)
Shir (2014)
Shir 2 (2016)
Lev El Haneshama (2019)
All Star - Teniyos (2022)

References

1951 births
Living people
American Orthodox Jews
Israeli Orthodox Jews
Hasidic entertainers
Hasidic singers
Yiddish-language singers of the United States
Jewish American musicians
Israeli musicians
Musicians from Brooklyn
People from Sea Gate, Brooklyn
Werdyger family
Orthodox pop musicians